Spencer Douglass Crockwell (April 29, 1904, Columbus, Ohio – November 30, 1968, Glens Falls, New York) was an American commercial artist and experimental filmmaker. He was most famous for his illustrations and advertisements for The Saturday Evening Post and for murals and posters for the Works Progress Administration.

Education and career

He received a B.Sc. from the Washington University (1926) in St. Louis and studied at the Chicago Academy of Fine Arts (1927) and the St. Louis School of Fine Arts (1927–31).

Crockwell's paintings have been featured in advertisements for Friskies dog food and in a poster for the American Relief for Holland. For the latter, he was awarded a gold medal from the Art Director's Club in 1946.

Posters
Crockwell created recruiting and other posters for various branches of the United States government during World War II, and many illustrations for The Saturday Evening Post.

He also created poster art for the MGM film The Yearling (1946).

Murals
Federally commissioned murals were produced from 1934 to 1944 in the United States through the Section of Painting and Sculpture, later called the Section of Fine Arts, of the Treasury Department.
Crockwell painted three. In 1937 he completed an oil on canvas mural, Vermont Industries, for the post office in White River Junction, Vermont. In 1938, he completed Endicott, 1901- Excavating for the Ideal Factory, also an oil on canvas, for the post office in Endicott, New York. Signing of the Treaty of Dancing Rabbit Creek was painted in 1944 for the post office in Macon, Mississippi.

Filmmaking
In 1934, Crockwell began experimenting with non-representational films while balancing his career as an illustrator. He initially wanted to create flexible, low-cost animation techniques. In 1936–1937, he collaborated with David Smith, a sculptor, to create surrealistic films.

Clients

Brown & Bigelow
General Electric
General Motors
Welch's 
Lederle Laboratories
Wyeth
USO 
18 Saturday Evening Post covers
Standard Oil
General Mills
Kraft Foods 
Schrafft's Candies
Kolynos Toothpaste
Coca-Cola
Country Gentleman covers
Hiram Walker
Moxie
International Harvester
Grace Lines
110 United States Brewers' Association ads
WPA 
Ralston Purina
McCall's magazine
Avondale Mills 
American Tobacco Company
Coronet magazine
Curtis Publishing Company
Esquire magazine 
Republic Steel
United Artists
Life magazine
Look magazine
Camel Cigarettes 
U.S. Marine Corps
Women's Day magazine
Metro-Goldwyn-Mayer

Filmography
Glens Falls Sequence (1937–1946)
Fantasmagoria #1 (1938)
Fantasmagoria #2 (1939)
Simple Destiny Abstractions (1939–1940)
Fantasmagoria #3 (1940)
The Chase (1942)
The Long Bodies (1947)
Mutoscope reels: Red (1949), A Long Body (1950), Random Glow (c. 1950s), Stripes (c. 1950s), Ode to David (c. 1950s), Around the Valley (c. 1950s)

Legacy
Examples of his work are in the collections of the Pritzker Military Museum and Library, the Bangor Public Library, the Hennepin County Library, the George C. Marshall Library, among others.

Over the course of his career, Crockwell drew over four hundred full-page images; more than three billion prints of his works have been made.

See also
Experimental film
The Saturday Evening Post

References

Bibliography
 Crockwell, Spencer Douglass. Douglass Crockwell. 1977. 
 Kettlewell, James K. The Art of Douglass Crockwell. Glens Falls, N.Y.: Hyde Collection, 1977. 
New York Times obituary (December 2, 1968)

External links

Facebook page on Crockwell
Paper Workers (1934) at Smithsonian American Art website
Glens Falls Sequence at Vimeo
Douglass Crockwell at MoGraphWiki
"Essential Cinema" at Anthology Film Archives
Crockwell entry at WPAMurals
Crockwell at AskArt with Saturday Evening Post cover (April 4, 1942)
Douglass Crockwell

1904 births
1968 deaths
American experimental filmmakers
The Saturday Evening Post people
Washington University in St. Louis alumni
School of the Art Institute of Chicago alumni